Susan "Sue" Marie McLeish (born August 18, 1954) is a retired field hockey player from New Zealand, who was a member of the national team that finished sixth at the 1984 Summer Olympics in Los Angeles, California. She was born in Whangarei.

References
 New Zealand Olympic Committee

External links
 

New Zealand female field hockey players
Olympic field hockey players of New Zealand
Field hockey players at the 1984 Summer Olympics
1954 births
Living people
Field hockey players from Whangārei
20th-century New Zealand women
21st-century New Zealand women